Bulgaria Boulevard is a boulevard and key thoroughfare connecting the centre of Sofia, Bulgaria, with the southern neighbourhoods of the city and Boyana.

The National Palace of Culture is located close to the northern end of the boulevard, as after the intersection with Cherni Vrah Boulevard it continues as Evlogi Georgiev Boulevard towards Orlov most. The southern end of Bulgaria Boulevard is the intersection with the Sofia ring road towards Boyana, after which it is called Daskal St. Popandreev.

Neighbourhoods located along or near Bulgaria Boulevard, listed in a north to south order, include Ivan Vazov, Hipodruma, Belite brezi, Strelbishte, Krasno selo, Motopista, Borovo, Buxton, Gotse Delchev, Bokar, Manastirski Livadi and Boyana.

Gallery

See also 
 Bulgaria Mall

Streets in Sofia